Owenahincha is a beach located near Rosscarbery in County Cork. It is, as of 2022, a Blue Flag beach. There are a number of camping and caravan parks in the area.

References

Beaches of County Cork